The Museu de José Malhoa (José Malhoa Museum), in Caldas da Rainha, is a regional Portuguese museum, that hosts the finest collection of the Portuguese naturalist painter José Malhoa.  The museum building, the first purpose-built museum in Portugal, was constructed in 1940 and enlarged in 1950 and 1957. The museum's collection includes paintings, sculptures, medals, drawings and ceramics from the 19th and 20th centuries.

Localization

See also
 List of single-artist museums

References

External links

José Malhoa Museum at Direção Geral de Cultura do Centro
Museu José Malhoa at patrimoniocultural.pt
Museu José Malhoa

Culture in Caldas da Rainha
Art museums and galleries in Portugal
Modern art museums
Malhoa, Jose
Art museums established in 1933
1933 establishments in Portugal
Museums in Leiria District
Malhoa